Abundius (also Abondius, Abundias, or Abbondio; early fifth century – 469), venerated in the Catholic Church as Saint Abundius, was a bishop of Como, Northern Italy.

Biography
Abundius was born at Thessalonica. Around 448 Abundius became the fourth Bishop of Como, succeeding Amantius. He was present at the Council of Constantinople in 448, and took an active part against the Eutychian heresy at Chalcedon (451), where he was the representative of Pope Leo the Great. In 452 he also took part in the Council of Milan, convened to refute the same heresy. Abundius is one of those to whom the authorship of the Te Deum is attributed.

The Romanesque church of Sant'Abbondio at Como, consecrated in 1095 by Pope Urban II, is dedicated to him, and his relics are conserved beneath its principal altar.

References

External links
 Sant' Abbondio
Saints.SQPN: Saint Abundius
Catholic Online: Saint Abundius

Attribution

Year of birth unknown
469 deaths
Bishops of Como
5th-century Italian bishops
Saints from Roman Italy
5th-century Christian saints
Byzantine Thessalonians
5th-century Romans
5th-century Italian writers